Carex dielsiana is a tussock-forming perennial in the family Cyperaceae. It is native to southern parts of China.

See also
 List of Carex species

References

dielsiana
Plants described in 1913
Taxa named by Georg Kükenthal
Flora of China